"Hansel and Gretel" is a German fairy tale collected by the Brothers Grimm and published in 1812 as part of Grimm's Fairy Tales (KHM 15). It is also known as Little Step Brother and Little Step Sister.

Hansel and Gretel are siblings who are abandoned in a forest and fall into the hands of a witch who lives in a gingerbread, cake, and candy house. The witch, who has cannibalistic intentions, intends to fatten Hansel before eventually eating him. However, Gretel saves her brother by pushing the witch into her own oven, killing her, and escaping with the witch's treasure.

Set in medieval Germany, "Hansel and Gretel" has been adapted into various media, including the opera  by Engelbert Humperdinck, which was first performed in 1893.

Origin

Sources 
Although Jacob and Wilhelm Grimm credited "various tales from Hesse" (the region where they lived) as their source, scholars have argued that the brothers heard the story in 1809 from the family of Wilhelm's friend and future wife, Dortchen Wild, and partly from other sources. A handwritten note in the Grimms' personal copy of the first edition reveals that in 1813 Wild contributed to the children's verse answer to the witch, "The wind, the wind,/ The heavenly child," which rhymes in German: "Der Wind, der Wind,/ Das himmlische Kind."

According to folklorist Jack Zipes, the tale emerged in the Late Middle Ages Germany (1250–1500). Shortly after this period, close written variants like Martin Montanus' Garten Gesellschaft (1590) began to appear. Scholar Christine Goldberg argues that the episode of the paths marked with stones and crumbs, already found in the French "Finette Cendron" and "Hop-o'-My-Thumb" (1697), represents "an elaboration of the motif of the thread that Ariadne gives Theseus to use to get out of the Minoan labyrinth". A house made of confectionery is also found in a 14th-century manuscript about the Land of Cockayne.

Editions 

From the pre-publication manuscript of 1810 (Das Brüderchen und das Schwesterchen) to the sixth edition of Kinder- und Hausmärchen (Grimm's Fairy Tales) in 1850, the Brothers Grimm made several alterations to the story, which progressively gained in length, psychological motivation, and visual imagery, but also became more Christian in tone, shifting the blame for abandonment from a mother to a stepmother associated with the witch.

In the original edition of the tale, the woodcutter's wife is the children's biological mother, but she was also called "stepmother" from the 4th edition (1840). The Brothers Grimm indeed introduced the word "stepmother", but retained "mother" in some passages. Even their final version in the 7th edition (1857) remains unclear about her role, for it refers to the woodcutter's wife twice as "the mother" and once as "the stepmother".

The sequence where the duck helps them across the river is also a later addition. In some later versions, the mother died from unknown causes, left the family, or remained with the husband at the end of the story. In the 1810 pre-publication manuscript, the children were called "Little Brother" and "Little Sister", then named Hänsel and Gretel in the first edition (1812). Wilhelm Grimm also adulterated the text with Alsatian dialects, "re-appropriated" from August Ströber's Alsatian version (1842) in order to give the tale a more "folksy" tone.

Goldberg notes that although "there is no doubt that the Grimms' Hänsel und Gretel was pieced together, it was, however, pieced together from traditional elements," and its previous narrators themselves had been "piecing this little tale together with other traditional motifs for centuries." For instance, the duck helping the children cross the river may be the remnant of an old traditional motif in the folktale complex that was reintroduced by the Grimms in later editions.

Plot
 In medieval Germany, Hansel and Gretel are the young children of a poor woodcutter. When a famine settles over the land, the woodcutter's second wife tells the woodcutter to take the children into the woods and leave them there to fend for themselves, so that she and her husband do not starve to death. The woodcutter opposes the plan, but his wife claims that maybe a stranger will take the children in and provide for them, which the woodcutter and she simply cannot do. With the scheme seemingly justified, the woodcutter reluctantly is forced to submit to it. They are unaware that in the children's bedroom, Hansel and Gretel have overheard them. After the parents have gone to bed, Hansel sneaks out of the house and gathers as many white pebbles as he can, then returns to his room, reassuring Gretel that God will not forsake them.

The next day, the family walk deep into the woods and Hansel lays a trail of white pebbles. After their parents abandon them, the children wait for the moon to rise and then follow the pebbles back home. They return home safely, much to their stepmother's rage. Once again, provisions become scarce and the stepmother angrily orders her husband to take the children further into the woods and leave them there. Hansel and Gretel attempt to gather more pebbles, but find the front door locked.

The following morning, the family treks into the woods. Hansel takes a slice of bread and leaves a trail of bread crumbs for them to follow to return back home. However, after they are once again abandoned, they find that the birds have eaten the crumbs and they are lost in the woods. After days of wandering, they follow a dove to a clearing in the woods, and discover a gingerbread house. Hungry and tired, the children begin to eat the house, when the door opens and the elderly woman that lives there emerges and lures the children inside with the promise of soft beds and delicious food. They enter without realizing that their hostess is a witch who built the gingerbread house to waylay children to cook and eat them.

The next morning, the witch locks Hansel in an iron cage in the garden and forces Gretel into becoming a slave. The witch feeds Hansel regularly to fatten him up, but serves Gretel nothing but crab shells. The witch then tries to touch Hansel's finger to see how fat he has become, but Hansel cleverly offers a thin bone he found in the cage. As the witch's eyes are too weak to notice the deception, she is fooled into thinking Hansel is still too thin to eat. After weeks of this, the witch grows impatient and decides to eat Hansel anyway.

She prepares the oven for Hansel, but decides she is hungry enough to eat Gretel, too. She coaxes Gretel to the open oven and asks her to lean over in front of it to see if the fire is hot enough. Gretel, sensing the witch's intent, pretends she does not understand what the witch means. Infuriated, the witch demonstrates, and Gretel instantly shoves her into the hot oven, slams and bolts the door shut, killing the witch. Gretel frees Hansel from the cage and the pair discover a vase full of treasure, including precious stones. Putting the jewels into their clothing, the children set off for home. A white duck (swan in some versions) ferries them across an expanse of water, and at home they find only their father; his wife having died from an unknown cause. Their father had spent all his days lamenting the loss of his children, and is delighted to see them safe and sound. With the witch's wealth, they all live happily ever after.

Variants 
Folklorists Iona and Peter Opie indicate that "Hansel and Gretel" belongs to a group of European tales especially popular in the Baltic regions, about children outwitting ogres into whose hands they have involuntarily fallen.

ATU 327A tales 
"Hansel and Gretel" is the prototype for the fairy tales of the type Aarne–Thompson–Uther (ATU) 327A. In particular, Gretel's pretense of not understanding how to test the oven ("Show Me How") is characteristic of 327A, although it also appears traditionally in other sub-types of ATU 327. As argued by Stith Thompson, the simplicity of the tale may explain its spread into several traditions all over the world.

A closely similar version is "Finette Cendron", published by Marie-Catherine d’Aulnoy in 1697, which depicts an impoverished king and queen deliberately losing their three daughters three times in the wilderness. The cleverest of the girls, Finette, initially manages to bring them home with a trail of thread, and then a trail of ashes, but her peas are eaten by pigeons during the third journey. The little girls then go to the mansion of a hag, who lives with her husband the ogre. Finette heats the oven and asks the ogre to test it with his tongue, so that he falls in and is incinerated. Thereafter, Finette cuts off the hag's head. The sisters remain in the ogre's house, and the rest of the tale relates the story of "Cinderella".

In the Russian Vasilisa the Beautiful, the stepmother likewise sends her hated stepdaughter into the forest to borrow a light from her sister, who turns out to be Baba Yaga, a cannibalistic witch. Besides highlighting the endangerment of children (as well as their own cleverness), the tales have in common a preoccupation with eating and with hurting children: The mother or stepmother wants to avoid hunger, and the witch lures children to eat her house of candy so that she can then eat them.

In a variant from Flanders, The Sugar-Candy House, siblings Jan and Jannette get lost in the woods and sight a hut made of confectionary in the distance. When they approach, a giant wolf named Garon jumps out of the window and chases them to a river bank. Sister and brother ask a pair of ducks to help them cross the river and escape the wolf. Garon threatens the ducks to carry him over, to no avail; he then tries to cross by swimming. He sinks and surfaces three times, but disappears in the water on the fourth try. The story seems to contain the "child/wind" rhyming scheme of the German tale.

In a French fairy tale, La Cabane au Toit de Fromage ("The Hut with the Roof made of Cheese"), the brother is the hero who deceives the witch and locks her up in the oven.

In the first Puerto Rican variant of "The Orphaned Children," the brother pushes the witch into the oven.

Other folk tales of ATU 327A type include the French "The Lost Children", published by Antoinette Bon in 1887, or the Moravian "Old Gruel", edited by Maria Kosch in 1899.

The Children and the Ogre (ATU 327) 
Structural comparisons can also be made with other tales of ATU 327 type ("The Children and the Ogre"), which is not a simple fairy tale type but rather a "folktale complex with interconnected subdivisions" depicting a child (or children) falling under the power of an ogre, then escaping by their clever tricks.

In ATU 327B ("The Brothers and the Ogre"), a group of siblings come to an ogre's house who intends to kill them in their beds, but the youngest of the children exchanges the visitors with the ogre's offspring, and the villain kills his own children by mistake. They are chased by the ogre, but the siblings eventually manage to come back home safely. Stith Thompson points the great similarity of the tales types ATU 327A and ATU 327B that "it is quite impossible to disentangle the two tales".

ATU 327C ("The Devil [Witch] Carries the Hero Home in a Sack") depicts a witch or an ogre catching a boy in a sack. As the villain's daughter is preparing to kill him, the boy asks her to show him how he should arrange himself; when she does so, he kills her. Later on, he kills the witch and goes back home with her treasure. In ATU 327D ("The Kiddlekaddlekar"), children are discovered by an ogre in his house. He intends to hang them, but the girl pretends not to understand how to do it, so the ogre hangs himself to show her. He promises his kiddlekaddlekar (a magic cart) and treasure in exchange for his liberation; they set him free, but the ogre chases them. The children eventually manage to kill him and escape safely. In ATU 327F ("The Witch and the Fisher Boy"), a witch lures a boy and catches him. When the witch's daughter tries to bake the child, he pushes her into the oven. The witch then returns home and eats her own daughter. She eventually tries to fell the tree in which the boy is hiding, but birds fly away with him.

Further comparisons 
The initial episode, which depicts children deliberately lost in the forest by their unloving parents, can be compared with many previous stories: Montanus's "The Little Earth-Cow" (1557), Basile's "Ninnillo and Nennella" (1635), Madame d'Aulnoy's "Finette Cendron" (1697), or Perrault's "Hop-o'-My-Thumb" (1697). The motif of the trail that fails to lead the protagonists back home is also common to "Ninnillo and Nennella", "Finette Cendron" and "Hop-o'-My-Thumb", and the Brothers Grimm identified the latter as a parallel story.

Finally, ATU 327 tales share a similar structure with ATU 313 ("Sweetheart Roland", "The Foundling", "Okerlo") in that one or more protagonists (specifically children in ATU 327) come into the domain of a malevolent supernatural figure and escape from it. Folklorist Joseph Jacobs, commenting on his reconstructed proto-form of the tale (Johnnie and Grizzle), noticed the "contamination" of the tale with the story of The Master Maid, later classified as ATU 313. ATU 327A tales are also often combined with stories of ATU 450 ("Little Brother and Sister"), in which children run away from an abusive stepmother.

Analysis 
According to folklorist Jack Zipes, the tale celebrates the symbolic order of the patriarchal home, seen as a haven protected from the dangerous characters that threaten the lives of children outside, while it systematically denigrates the adult female characters, which are seemingly intertwined between each other. The death of the mother or stepmother soon after the children kill the witch suggests that they may be metaphorically the same woman. Zipes also argues that the importance of the tale in the European oral and literary tradition may be explained by the theme of child abandonment and abuse. Due to famines and lack of birth control, it was common in medieval Europe to abandon unwanted children in front of churches or in the forest. The death of the mother during childbirth sometimes led to tensions after remarriage, and Zipes proposes that it may have played a role in the emergence of the motif of the wicked stepmother.

Linguist and folklorist Edward Vajda has proposed that these stories represent the remnant of a coming-of-age, rite of passage tale extant in Proto-Indo-European society. Psychologist Bruno Bettelheim argues that the main motif revolves around dependence, oral greed, and destructive desires that children must learn to overcome, after they arrive home "purged of their oral fixations". Others have stressed the satisfying psychological effects of the children vanquishing the witch or realizing the death of their wicked stepmother.

Cultural legacy

Stage and musical theater
The fairy tale enjoyed a multitude of adaptations for the stage, among them the opera Hänsel und Gretel by Engelbert Humperdinck—one of the most performed operas. It is principally based upon the Grimm's version, although it omits the deliberate abandonment of the children.

A contemporary reimagining of the story, Mátti Kovler's musical fairytale Ami & Tami, was produced in Israel and the United States and subsequently released as a symphonic album.

Literature 
Several writers have drawn inspiration from the tale, such as Robert Coover in "The Gingerbread House" (Pricks and Descants, 1970), Anne Sexton in Transformations (1971), Garrison Keillor in "My Stepmother, Myself" in "Happy to Be Here" (1982), and Emma Donoghue in "A Tale of the Cottage" (Kissing the Witch, 1997). Adam Gidwitz's 2010 children's book A Tale Dark & Grimm and its sequels In a Glass Grimmly (2012), and The Grimm Conclusion (2013) are loosely based on the tale and show the siblings meeting characters from other fairy tales.
Terry Pratchett mentions gingerbread cottages in several of his books, mainly where a witch had turned wicked and 'started to cackle', with the gingerbread house being a stage in a person's increasing levels of insanity. In The Light Fantastic the wizard Rincewind and Twoflower are led by a gnome into one such building after the death of the witch and warned to be careful of the doormat, as it is made of candy floss.

Film
 Hansel and Gretel: An Opera Fantasy, a 1954 stop-motion animated theatrical feature film directed by John Paul and released by RKO Radio Pictures.
 A 1983 episode of Shelley Duvall's Faerie Tale Theatre starred Ricky Schroder as Hansel and Joan Collins as the stepmother/witch.
Hansel and Gretel, a 1983 TV special directed by Tim Burton.
Hansel and Gretel, a 1987 American/Israeli musical film directed by Len Talan with David Warner, Cloris Leachman, Hugh Pollard and Nicola Stapleton. Part of the 1980s film series Cannon Movie Tales.
 Elements from the story were used in the 1994 horror film Wes Craven's New Nightmare for its climax.
 "Hänsel und Gretel" by 2012 German Broadcaster RBB released as part of its series Der rbb macht Familienzeit.
 Hansel & Gretel: Witch Hunters (2013) by Tommy Wirkola with Jeremy Renner and Gemma Arterton, (USA, Germany). The film follows the adventures of Hansel & Gretel who became adults.
 Gretel & Hansel, a 2020 American horror film directed by Oz Perkins in which Gretel is a teenager while Hansel is still a little boy.
 Secret Magic Control Agency (2021) is an animated retelling of the fairy tale by incorporating comedy and family genres

Computer programming 
Hansel and Gretel's trail of breadcrumbs inspired the name of the navigation element "breadcrumbs" that allows users to keep track of their locations within programs or documents.

Video games
 Hansel & Gretel and the Enchanted Castle (1995) by Terraglyph Interactive Studios is an adventure and hidden object game. The player controls Hansel, tasked with finding Prin, a forest imp, who holds the key to saving Gretel from the witch.
 Gretel and Hansel (2009) by Mako Pudding is a browser adventure game. Popular on Newgrounds for its gruesome reimagining of the story, it features hand painted watercolor backgrounds and characters animated by Flash.
 Fearful Tales: Hansel and Gretel Collector's Edition (2013) by Eipix Entertainment is a HOPA (hidden object puzzle adventure) game. The player, as Hansel and Gretel's mother, searches the witch's lair for clues.
 In the online role-playing game Poptropica, the Candy Crazed mini-quest (2021) includes a short retelling of the story. The player is summoned to the witch's castle to free the children, who have been imprisoned after eating some of the candy residents.

See also

"Brother and Sister"
"Esben and the Witch"
Gingerbread house
"Hop-o'-My-Thumb" (French fairy tale by Charles Perrault)
"The Hut in the Forest"
"Jorinde and Joringel"
"Molly Whuppie"
"Thirteenth"
The Truth About Hansel and Gretel

Footnotes

References

Citations

Bibliography

Primary sources

Further reading 
 de Blécourt, Willem. "On the Origin of Hänsel und Gretel". In: Fabula 49, 1-2 (2008): 30-46. doi: https://doi.org/10.1515/FABL.2008.004

 Freudenburg, Rachel. "Illustrating Childhood—"Hansel and Gretel"." Marvels & Tales 12, no. 2 (1998): 263-318. www.jstor.org/stable/41388498.
 Gaudreau, Jean. "Handicap et sentiment d'abandon dans trois contes de fées: Le petit Poucet, Hansel et Gretel, Jean-mon-Hérisson". In: Enfance, tome 43, n°4, 1990. pp. 395–404. [DOI: https://doi.org/10.3406/enfan.1990.1957]; www.persee.fr/doc/enfan_0013-7545_1990_num_43_4_1957
 Harshbarger, Scott. "Grimm and Grimmer: “Hansel and Gretel” and Fairy Tale Nationalism." Style 47, no. 4 (2013): 490-508. www.jstor.org/stable/10.5325/style.47.4.490.

 Taggart, James M. ""Hansel and Gretel" in Spain and Mexico." The Journal of American Folklore 99, no. 394 (1986): 435-60. doi:10.2307/540047.

External links

 
 Hansel and Gretel fairy tale
Original versions and psychological analysis of classic fairy tales, including Hansel and Gretel
The Story of Hansel and Gretel
Collaboratively illustrated story on Project Bookses
https://www.grimmstories.com/en/grimm_fairy-tales/hansel_and_gretel

Hansel and Gretel
Cannibalism in fiction
European fairy tales
Grimms' Fairy Tales
Literary duos
Child characters in fairy tales
Male characters in fairy tales
Female characters in fairy tales
Fictional German people
Witchcraft in fairy tales
European folklore characters
German fairy tales
Siblings in fiction
Germany in fiction
ATU 300-399
Child abandonment
Child abduction